Grigory Andreevich Rechkalov (9 February 1920 – 20 December 1990) was a Soviet fighter pilot during World War II who scored over fifty solo shootdowns, making him one of the highest scoring Soviet fighter pilots. He was twice awarded the title Hero of the Soviet Union for his aerial victories and went on to become a general after the war.

Early life
Rechkalov was born on 9 February 1920 in Khudyakovo into a Russian peasant family. After graduation from school, he joined the Army in 1938, and in 1939 graduated from Perm Military Aviation Pilot School. He was initially grounded because of Daltonism, but due to the start of the war he was allowed to fly in 1941 and posted to the 55th Fighter Aviation Regiment, stationed in the Odessa Military District.

World War II
He began his combat career on 22 June 1941 over Moldavia flying an I-153 marked "blue 13" on the tail, undertaking 30 sorties in this aircraft during the month and engaging in ten combats. On 27 June, Rechkalov attacked and brought down an Hs.126 east of Boksha, near Sculeni, for his first claim. On 11 July he claimed a Ju 88 near Kotovsk. On 26 July 1941 near Dubasari, he was wounded in the right leg by anti-aircraft fire. He returned safely to his airfield and after landing was hospitalized. Due to the severity of the wound he had was forced to stay with a reserve aviation unit for several months after the three surgeries. He returned to his previous in Spring 1942. Earlier, the unit has been honored with the guards designation and renamed 16 Guards Fighter Aviation Regiment for outstanding service.

By the end of 1942, Rechkalov had claimed 4 and 2 shared victories. At that time, the 16th Regiment was re-equipped with new P-39 Airacobras and temporarily posted to the reserve for training. In the spring of 1943, they were posted to the North Caucasus Front and the Kuban River. On 24 May 1943, he was awarded the title Hero of the Soviet Union for 12 solo and 2 shared shootdowns throughout 194 sorties.

In May 1944 Rechkalov took command over the 16th Guards Fighter Aviation Regiment, but on 31 May 1944, while leading a formation over Iași, five P-39s were lost after he decided to pursue a group of Bf 109 fighters alone. According to official accounts, Rechkalov was disciplined by his superiors for pursuing the enemy alone rather than offering leadership to his less experienced squadron. Upon the recommendation of his commanding officer Aleksandr Pokryshkin, Rechkalov was replaced by Boris Glinka of the 100th Guards Fighter Aviation Regiment as commander of the 16th Guards Fighter Aviation Regiment for (according to Pokryshkin) "losing control, indecisiveness and lack of initiative". Throughout the war Pokryshkin clashed with Rechkalov over his lack of discipline.

On 15 July 1944, Glinka was seriously wounded when he bailed out of his badly damaged P-39 and struck the tailplane. Rechkalov again took over as regiment commander, but left command of it in February 1945 and was appointed Inspector for Flight Training of 9th Guards Fighter Aviation Division.

By the end of the war he had flown 452 sorties and engaged in 122 dogfights; operational documents credit him with 56 solo and 6 shared kills, while certification documents credit him with 61 solo and 4 shared. He flew the I-153, I-16, MiG-3, Yak-1, and P-39, but a vast majority of his tally was on the P-39. His award nomination did not mention his three victories from 1941, although there have been allegations that Pokryshkin tried to steal some of Rechkalov's kills.

Postwar 
In 1951 he graduated from the Air Force Academy in Monino. He then commanded a regiment, and various air divisions. In 1957 he was deputy commander of the fighter aircraft separate Far Eastern Air Defense Army. Rechkalov went on to become a Major General of Aviation in the Soviet Air Force in 1957 before leaving the military in 1959. He wrote two books about his wartime experiences: Дымное небо войны (English: The Smoking Skies of War) and В Небе Молдавии (English: In Moldavian Skies). Rechkalov lived in Moscow until his death on 20 December 1990.

Awards and honors
 Twice Hero of the Soviet Union (24 May 1943 and 1 July 1944)
 Order of Lenin (24 May 1943)
 Four Order of the Red Banner (30 December 1942, 5 May 1943, 22 October 1944, and 14 August 1957)
 Order of Alexander Nevsky (2 October 1943)
 Two Order of the Red Star (26 October 1955 and 14 May 1956)
 campaign and jubilee medals

Footnotes

References

Bibliography
 
 

1920 births
1990 deaths
People from Irbitsky District
Soviet Air Force generals
Soviet major generals
Heroes of the Soviet Union
Russian aviators
Russian people of World War II
Soviet World War II flying aces
Recipients of the Order of Lenin
Recipients of the Order of the Red Banner
Recipients of the Order of Alexander Nevsky
Recipients of the Order of the Red Star